The Bosnia national rugby league team represents Bosnia and Herzegovina in the sport of rugby league football and have been participating in international competition since 2014.

History
Bosnia participated in the Balkans Cup competition in 2014. But their matches weren't rated as official international matches as the national association has yet to apply for RLEF membership. They won their first "Unofficial" match against Hungary by 32-6 in the Third Place play off match of the 2014 Balkans Cup tournament.

In January 2018 Bosnia and Herzegovina Rugby League Association is finally founded with base in Vitez. Currently it's observer member of Rugby League European Federation.

On RLEF Congress held in Belgrade in August 2018, Bosnia and Herzegovina Rugby League Association gets rights to host 2019 Balkans Cup in Vitez.

Current squad
Squad called for Balkans Rugby League 9s Cup:
Toni Šarić
Tino Šarić
Marko Banović
Lazar Karalić
Stjepan Križanac
Fadil Spahić
Boris Slijepčević
Jason Ljubljanac

Tournament history

Balkans Cup

Results

All-time results record
Below is table of the official representative rugby league matches played by Bosnia and Herzegovina at test level up until 6 June 2021:

Upcoming matches

References

External links
 https://www.rlef.eu.com/teams/63
 https://www.facebook.com/bhrugbyleague

Rugby league
National rugby league teams
Rugby league in Bosnia and Herzegovina